Idrottsföreningen Kamraterna Norrköping, more commonly known as IFK Norrköping or simply Norrköping, is a Swedish professional football club based in Norrköping. The club is affiliated to Östergötlands Fotbollförbund and play their home games at Östgötaporten. The club colours, reflected in their crest and kit, are white and blue. Formed on 29 May 1897, the club have won thirteen national championship titles and six national cup titles.

The club plays in the highest Swedish tier, Allsvenskan, which they first won in 1943. IFK Norrköping were most successful during the 1940s, when they won five Swedish championships and two Svenska Cupen titles under the Hungarian coach Lajos Czeizler and with players like Gunnar Nordahl and Nils Liedholm.

IFK Norrköping won the 2015 Allsvenskan, their first win since 1989, which also gave them a spot in the second qualification round of 2016–17 UEFA Champions League.

History
IFK Norrköping dominated Swedish football in the post war era and won the first division 11 times in 20 years, culminating in the league triumph of 1963. It took the club another 26 years before adding championship title number 12 to the trophy cabinet.

On 31 October 2015, IFK Norrköping won their 13th championship title after defeating the defending champions Malmö FF with 2–0 away in Swedbank Stadion in Malmö in the last round of 2015 Allsvenskan. This was the second time in a row they had to wait 26 years between titles. On 8 November IFK Norrköping won supercupen against Swedish cup winners IFK Göteborg. The result was 3–0 after a dominating performance from the reigning Swedish champions.

Rivalries
The club used to have a fierce rivalry with IK Sleipner, also from Norrköping, before Sleipner's fall from the higher divisions. Another historic rivalry is that against Åtvidabergs FF, also from the province of Östergötland, which was especially tense in the 1970s and early 2010s. This rivalry has lost importance since Åtvidaberg were relegated from Allsvenskan. IFK Norrköping also maintains a rivalry with Malmö FF; the fixtures between the clubs is sometimes known as "The Working Class Derby"

Players

First-team squad

Out on loan

Retired numbers
 12 – Fans of the club

Winners of Guldbollen

1947:  Gunnar Nordahl
1949:  Knut Nordahl
1953:  Bengt "Julle" Gustavsson
1957:  Åke "Bajdoff" Johansson
1960:  Torbjörn Jonsson
1961:  Bengt "Zamora" Nyholm
1963:  Harry Bild
1966:  Ove Kindvall
1968:  Björn Nordqvist
1990:  Tomas Brolin
1992:  Jan Eriksson

League top scorers

Allsvenskan
 Gunnar Nordahl 1944–45 (27 goals), 1945–46 (25 goals) and 1947–48 (18 goals)
 Harry Bild 1956–57 (19 goals)
 Henry "Putte" Källgren 1957–58 (27 goals) (shared with Bertil Johansson, IFK Göteborg)
 Ove Kindvall 1966 (20 goals)
 Jan Hellström 1989 (16 goals)
 Niclas Kindvall 1994 (23 goals)
 Imad Khalili 2013 (15 goals) (eight goals scored for Helsingborgs IF)
 Emir Kujović 2015 (21 goals)
 Kalle Holmberg 2017 (14 goals) (shared with Magnus Eriksson, Djurgårdens IF)
 Christoffer Nyman 2020 (18 goals)
 Samuel Adegbenro 2021 (17 goals)

Superettan (Division II 1924/1925–1986 and Division I 1987–1999)
 Stefan Pettersson 1983 (17 goals)
 Bruno Santos 2005 (17 goals)
 Garðar Gunnlaugsson 2007 (18 goals)

Management

Technical staff
As of 10 January 2021

Honours

League

 Swedish Champions
 Winners (13): 1942–43, 1944–45, 1945–46, 1946–47, 1947–48, 1951–52, 1955–56, 1956–57, 1960, 1962, 1963, 1989, 2015
 Allsvenskan:
 Winners (12): 1942–43, 1944–45, 1945–46, 1946–47, 1947–48, 1951–52, 1955–56, 1956–57, 1960, 1962, 1963,  2015
 Runners-up (10): 1952–53, 1957–58, 1959, 1961, 1966, 1987, 1989, 1990, 1993, 2018
 Superettan:
 Winners (1): 2007
 Runners-up (1): 2010
 Mästerskapsserien:
 Runners-up (2): 1991, 1992

Cups
 Svenska Cupen:
 Winners (6): 1943, 1945, 1968–69, 1987–88, 1990–91, 1993–94
 Runners-up (5): 1944, 1953, 1967, 1971–72, 2016–17
 Svenska Supercupen:
 Winners (1): 2015

IFK Norrköping in Europe

Records
Most played games (Allsvenskan or Division I):
  Åke "Bajdoff" Johansson, 321 games (1949–65)
Most league goals (Allsvenskan or Division I):
  Henry "Putte" Källgren, 126 goals (1951–60)
Most spectators:
 32 234 against Malmö FF, 7 June 1956
Biggest victory (Allsvenskan or Division I):
 11–1 against Djurgårdens IF, 14 October 1945.
Biggest defeat (Allsvenskan or Division I):
 0 – 11 against Örgryte IS, 6 April 1928 and Helsingborgs IF, 22 September 1929

Managerial history
List of IFK Norrköping managers 1905– 

 Alexander “Sandy” Tait (1905)
 Fred Spiksley (1910)
 Herbert Butterworth (1921–22)
 Imre Schlosser (1923–24)
 Rudolf Haglund (1925–35) 
 Sölve Flisberg (1936)
 Vilgot Lindberg (1936–37)
 Torsten Johansson (1937–38)
 Bengt Flisberg (1938–41)
 Rudolf Haglund (1941) 
 Lajos Czeizler (1942–48)
 Eric Keen (1949)
 Karl Adamek (1950–53)
 Torsten Lindberg (1954)
 Karl Adamek (1955–57)
 Vilmos Varszegi (1957–62)
 Georg Ericson (1958–66)
 Gunnar Nordahl (1967–70)
 Gösta Löfgren (1971–72) 
 Örjan Martinsson (1973–74) 
 Bengt Gustavsson (1975–78)
 Gunnar Nordahl (1979–80)
 Bo Axberg (1981–82)
 Lars-Göran Qwist (1983–84)
 Kent Karlsson (1985–89)
 Jörgen Augustsson (1990)
 Sanny Åslund (1991–92)
 Sören Cratz (1993–94)
 Kent Karlsson (1995)
 Tomas Nordahl (1995)
 Colin Toal (1996–97)
 Olle Nordin (1997–00)
 Tor-Arne Fredheim (2001)
 Bengt-Arne Strömberg (2002)
 Håkan Ericson (2002–03)
 Stefan Hellberg  (2004–05)
 Mats Jingblad (2005–08)
 Sören Cratz (2007–08)
 Göran Bergort (2009–10)
 Janne Andersson (1 January 2011 – 23 June 2016)
 Jens Gustafsson (24 June 2016 – 19 december 2020)
 Rikard Norling (23 December 2020 – 11 July 2022)
 Anes Mravac (11 July 2022 – 8 August 2022) Caretaker
 Vedran Vucicevic (11 July 2022 – 8 August 2022) Caretaker
 Glen Riddersholm (8 August 2022 –)

Affiliate clubs
 IF Sylvia
 Husqvarna FF

Other sections
IFK Norrköping also maintains departments for women's football, set up in 2009, orienteering, bowling and bandy. The bandy team played in Sweden's highest division in 1937.

Part of the club was also an ice hockey team which played in the seasons 1950/51 and 1955/56 in the highest Swedish division. The ice hockey teams of IFK and local rivals IK Sleipner were joined in 1967 to form IF IFK/IKS, known from 1973 forward as IK Vita Hästen ("Ice Hockey Club White Horse") which evolved into today's HC Vita Hästen.

Footnotes

References

External links

 IFK Norrköping – official site
 Peking Fanz – official supporter club site
 IFK Norrköpings Supporter klubb – official supporter club site for seniors
 gopeking.net – IFK Norrköpings oldest supporter site
 Parkens vita hjältar – supporter site

 
Football clubs in Östergötland County
Sport in Norrköping
Allsvenskan clubs
Association football clubs established in 1897
Bandy clubs established in 1897
1897 establishments in Sweden
Idrottsföreningen Kamraterna
Svenska Cupen winners